Daniar Kobonov (born September 8, 1982) is a male Greco-Roman wrestler from Kyrgyzstan.  He has competed at two Olympic games, the 2004 Olympic Games and the 2012 Olympic Games.

References
 bio on fila-wrestling.com

External links
 

Living people
1982 births
Olympic wrestlers of Kyrgyzstan
Wrestlers at the 2004 Summer Olympics
Wrestlers at the 2012 Summer Olympics
Asian Games medalists in wrestling
Wrestlers at the 2002 Asian Games
Wrestlers at the 2006 Asian Games
Wrestlers at the 2010 Asian Games
Kyrgyzstani sportsmen
Kyrgyzstani male sport wrestlers
World Wrestling Championships medalists
Asian Games gold medalists for Kyrgyzstan
Asian Games silver medalists for Kyrgyzstan
Asian Games bronze medalists for Kyrgyzstan
Medalists at the 2002 Asian Games
Medalists at the 2006 Asian Games
Medalists at the 2010 Asian Games
21st-century Kyrgyzstani people